Crambus boislamberti is a moth in the family Crambidae. It was described by Rougeot in 1977. It is found in Ethiopia.

References

Endemic fauna of Ethiopia
Crambini
Moths described in 1977
Moths of Africa